"Nobody's Real" is a song by Powerman 5000 from the album Tonight the Stars Revolt! and on the End of Days soundtrack. On the band's tour in early 2000, they performed the song in a modified version, for their encores.

Music video
A music video was made in which a young boy discovers a robotic mask that grants him supernatural powers. The video was directed by David Meyers and Spider One.

Track listing

Charts

References

Powerman 5000 songs
DreamWorks Records singles
Geffen Records singles
Warner Music Group singles
Songs written for films
Music videos directed by Dave Meyers (director)